{{about|the 1940 film|the 1937 film entitled Park Avenue Logger, known in Great Britain as Millionaire Playboy|Park Avenue Logger}}Millionaire Playboy originally entitled Playboy No. 2'' is a 1940 American comedy film directed by Leslie Goodwins from a screenplay by Bert Granet and Charles E. Roberts, based upon Granet's story. Produced and distributed by RKO Radio Pictures, it was released on March 15, 1940, and stars Joe Penner, Linda Hayes, and Russ Brown. It was Joe Penner's last film before he died in 1941.

Plot

Joe Zany (Joe Penner) a hapless young socialite attempts to overcome an embarrassing romantic problem. It seems every time he kisses a girl, he gets a horrible case of hiccups. Anxious to cure him, his father spends a small fortune to take his son to a special psychologist who in turn sends Joe to a beautiful spa, owned by Lois Marlowe (Linda Hayes), filled with gorgeous young women.

Cast
 Joe Penner as Joe Zany, aka Mr. Joe Potter
 Linda Hayes as Lois Marlowe
 Russ Brown as Mr. Bob Norman
 Fritz Feld as 'G.G.' Gorta
 Tom Kennedy as Tom Murphy
 Granville Bates as Stafford
 Arthur Q. Bryan as J.B. Zany
 Pamela Blake as Eleanor (as Adele Pearce)
 Diane Hunter as Hattie
 Mary Beth Milford as Bertha 
 Mantan Moreland as Bellhop

References

External links 
 
 
 
 

1940 films
American black-and-white films
RKO Pictures films
1940 comedy films
American comedy films
Films scored by Paul Sawtell
1940s English-language films
Films directed by Leslie Goodwins
1940s American films